Rommel Donald, known by his stage name ROMderful (formerly ROM) is a British producer, DJ, and multi-instrumentalist from Birmingham. He released his debut studio album, Press L to Continue, on Same Plate/Sony in April 2019.

Early life and education

Rommel Donald was born and grew up in Birmingham, England. As a child, he learned how to make beats and play multiple instruments, including the guitar, bass guitar, violin, and drums. He was also childhood friends with fellow artist and future collaborator, KayFaraway. He drew inspiration from church music, early 2000s R&B, and video game soundtracks. In his teenage years, he was a member of a death metal band. He would later attend university while also working on his music. During his second semester of university in 2015, however, Donald opted to drop out and focus on music full time.

Career

Donald began producing music under the stage name ROM (or R.O.M.) in 2015. In late 2015, he collaborated with DEFFIE on a remix of Pharrell's "Frontin'". In early 2016, he released the track "I Just Want You To Know" which sampled the Snoop Dogg song, "Beautiful". In March of that year, he released a 3-track EP as part of his record label Soulection's White Label series. That collection contained the song "You Love Em" featuring Emmavie. Later that year, he earned a placement on the remix album for GoldLink's And After That, We Didn't Talk, reworking the track, "Late Night". He also remixed tracks from Raye ("I, U, Us") and Linden Jay ("Lose Again" featuring Shola Ama). In December 2016, ROM released a track called "Kiss and Tell" featuring the vocals of Naji.

In 2017, he adopted his current stage name, ROMderful. He also released several new tracks including "Only One" (with Tendayi) and "SoReal?" (with KayFaraway). Additionally, he produced the Jean Deaux record, "Wikipedia", and appeared on Kitsuné's Afterwork Vol 1 compilation album with the track "BeThere4Me" (featuring KayFaraway). In 2018, ROMderful continued working with Jean Deaux, producing her song "Energy" which was the lead single off her EP, Krash. That year, he was also signed to Same Plate Entertainment, a joint venture label with Sony Music.

In March 2019, he released a collaborative EP, Hours After Midnight, with KayFaraway. The following month, he released his debut studio album, Press L to Continue, on Same Plate/Sony. The album was preceded by the singles "Run Tings" (with Shakka and featuring Dounia) and "1 Missed Call" (featuring Dean and Tabber). The album also featured guest appearances from TOBi, Jay Prince, Devin Tracy, Wade, and KayFaraway. Vocals from ROMderful himself also appeared on the album. Music videos for "Run Tings" and "Tired of the Games" (featuring TOBi) premiered after the album's release. ROMderful also produced the Duckwrth track "KING KING" released in May 2019 and the Jean Deaux track, "Anytime" (featuring Kehlani) released in June 2019.

Discography

Studio albums

EPs

Singles

Production and remixes

References

External links
ROMderful on SoundCloud

Living people
Sony Music artists
Musicians from Birmingham, West Midlands
British hip hop record producers
British songwriters
English DJs
Year of birth missing (living people)